Kédougou Department is one of the 45 departments of Senegal, located in the Kédougou Region, formerly part of the Tambacounda Region.

The chief settlement and only commune is Kédougou.

The rural districts (Communautés rurales) comprise:
 Arrondissement of Bandafassi:
 Ninéfécha
 
 
 
Arrondissement of Fongolimbi:

Historic sites
 Dindefelo Falls, natural site 
 Site of Iwol at Bandafassi, up the mountain, the "Place of silence"
 Bassari Country

References

Departments of Senegal